Ubbe Ert Iwwerks (March 24, 1901 – July 7, 1971), known as Ub Iwerks, was an American animator, cartoonist, character designer, inventor, and special effects technician, known for his work with Walt Disney Animation Studios in general, and for having worked on the development of the design of the character of Mickey Mouse, among others. Born in Kansas City, Missouri, Iwerks grew up with a contentious relationship with his father, who abandoned him as a child. Iwerks met fellow artist Walt Disney while working at a Kansas City art studio in 1919. After briefly working as illustrators for a local newspaper company, Disney and Iwerks ventured into animation together. Iwerks joined Disney as chief animator on the Laugh-O-Gram shorts series beginning in 1922, but a studio bankruptcy would cause Disney to relocate to Los Angeles in 1923. In the new studio, Iwerks continued to work with Disney on the Alice Comedies as well as the creation of the Oswald the Lucky Rabbit character. Following the first Oswald short, both Universal Pictures and the Winkler Pictures production company insisted that the Oswald character be redesigned. At the insistence of Disney, Iwerks designed a number of new characters for the studio, including designs that would be used for Clarabelle Cow and Horace Horsecollar.

One of Iwerks' most long-lasting contributions to animation was a refined version of a sketch drawn by Disney that would later go on to become Mickey Mouse. Iwerks went on to do much of the animation for the early Mickey Mouse and Silly Symphony cartoons, including Steamboat Willie, The Skeleton Dance and The Haunted House, before a fallout with Disney led to Iwerks' resignation from the studio in January 1930. Iwerks' final Mickey Mouse cartoon would be 1930's The Cactus Kid. Following his separation with Disney, Iwerks, operating under Iwerks Studio, would go on to create the characters Flip the Frog and Willie Whopper along with the ComiColor Cartoons series as part of a contract with Metro-Goldwyn-Mayer, but the new studio failed to rival its competitors. Iwerks would go on to direct two Looney Tunes cartoon shorts for Leon Schlesinger Productions and several Color Rhapsody cartoons for Screen Gems before joining Disney again in 1940, after which he worked with special visual effects on productions such as 1946's Song of the South.

Iwerks had two children, Donald Warren Iwerks and David Lee Iwerks, both born with his partner Mildred Sarah Henderson. Iwerks died of a heart attack in Burbank, California, in 1971 at age 70. Iwerks was posthumously named a Disney Legend in 1989. His likeness has been featured in his granddaughter Leslie Iwerks' 1999 documentary The Hand Behind the Mouse: The Ub Iwerks Story as well as the 2014 feature film Walt Before Mickey, in which he is portrayed by Armando Gutierrez. Iwerks received three nominations at the Academy Awards, for which he won one. He also posthumously received the Winsor McCay Award at the 1978 Annie Awards and the Hall of Fame award at the 2017 Visual Effects Society Awards.

Early life 
Iwerks was born in Kansas City, Missouri. His father was born in the village of Uttum in East Frisia (northwest Germany, today part of the municipality of Krummhörn) and emigrated to the United States in 1869 around the age of 14. The elder Iwerks, who worked as a barber, had fathered and abandoned several previous children and wives. When Ub was a teenager, his father abandoned him as well, forcing the boy to drop out of school and work to support his mother. Iwerks despised his father and never spoke of him; upon learning that he had died, he reportedly said, "Throw him in a ditch." Ub's full name, Ubbe Ert Iwwerks, can be seen on early Alice Comedies that he signed. Several years later, he simplified his name to "Ub Iwerks", sometimes written as "U.B. Iwerks".

Career

Disney work (1919–1929)
Iwerks spent most of his career with Disney. The two met in 1919 while working for the Pesmen-Rubin Art Studio in Kansas City, and eventually started their own commercial art business together. Disney and Iwerks then found work as illustrators for the Kansas City Slide Newspaper Company (which was later named The Kansas City Film Ad Company). While working for the Kansas City Film Ad Company, Disney decided to take up work in animation, and Iwerks soon joined him. There he attached a motor drive to the camera with a switch that resembled a telegraph key, reducing the number of people needed to animate from two to just one.

Iwerks was responsible for the distinctive style of the earliest Disney animated cartoons, and was also responsible for designing Mickey Mouse.<ref name="Maltin, L. 1987">{{Cite book |last=Maltin |first=Leonard |title=Of Mice and Magic: A History of American Animated Cartoons (Rev. ed.) |publisher=New American Library |year=1987 |location=New York}}</ref> In 1922, when Disney began his Laugh-O-Gram cartoon series, Iwerks joined him as chief animator. The studio went bankrupt, however, and in 1923 Iwerks followed Disney's move to Los Angeles to work on a new series of cartoons known as "the Alice Comedies" which had live-action mixed with animation. After the end of this series, Disney asked Iwerks to design a character that became Oswald the Lucky Rabbit. The first cartoon Oswald starred in was animated entirely by Iwerks. Following the first cartoon, Oswald was redesigned on the insistence of Oswald's owner and the distributor of the cartoons, Universal Pictures. The production company at the time, Winkler Pictures, gave additional input on the character's design.

In spring 1928, Disney was removed from the Oswald series, and much of his staff was hired away to Winkler Pictures. He promised to never again work with a character he did not own. Disney asked Iwerks, who stayed on, to start drawing up new character ideas. Iwerks tried sketches of frogs, dogs, and cats, but none of these appealed to Disney. A female cow and male horse were created at this time by Iwerks, but were also rejected. They later turned up as Clarabelle Cow and Horace Horsecollar. Ub Iwerks eventually got inspiration from an old drawing. In 1925, Hugh Harman drew some sketches of mice around a photograph of Walt Disney. Then, on a train ride back from a failed business meeting, Walt Disney came up with the original sketch for the character that was eventually called Mickey Mouse. Afterward, Disney took the sketch to Iwerks. In turn, he drew a more clean-cut and refined version of Mickey, but one that still followed the original sketch.

The first few Mickey Mouse and Silly Symphony cartoons were animated almost entirely by Iwerks, including Steamboat Willie, The Skeleton Dance and The Haunted House. However, as Iwerks began to draw more and more cartoons on a daily basis, he chafed under Disney's dictatorial rule. Iwerks also felt he wasn't getting the credit he deserved for drawing all of Disney's successful cartoons. Eventually, Iwerks and Disney had a falling out; their friendship and working partnership were severed in January 1930. According to an unconfirmed account, a child approached Disney and Iwerks at a party and asked for a picture of Mickey to be drawn on a napkin, to which Disney handed the pen and paper to Iwerks and stated, "Draw it." Iwerks became furious and threw the pen and paper, storming out. Iwerks accepted a contract with Disney's former distributor, Pat Powers to leave Disney and start an animation studio under his own name. His last Mickey Mouse cartoon was Wild Waves (1929) and final Disney film was the Silly Symphony Autumn (1930). (Powers and Disney had an earlier falling-out over Disney's use of the Powers Cinephone sound-on-film system—actually copied by Powers from DeForest Phonofilm without credit—in early Disney cartoons.)

 After Disney (1930–1940) 

The Iwerks Studio opened in 1930. Financial backers led by Pat Powers suspected that Iwerks was responsible for much of Disney's early success. However, while animation for a time suffered at Disney from Iwerks' departure, it soon rebounded as Disney brought in talented new young animators.

Despite a contract with MGM to distribute his cartoons, and the introduction of a new character named "Flip the Frog", and later "Willie Whopper", the Iwerks Studio was never a major commercial success and failed to rival either Disney or Fleischer Studios.  Newly hired animator Fred Kopietz recommended that Iwerks employ a friend from Chouinard Art School, Chuck Jones, who was hired and put  to work as a cel washer.  The Flip and Willie cartoons were later distributed on the home-movie market by Official Films in the 1940s. From 1933 to 1936, he produced a series of shorts (independently distributed, not part of the MGM deal) in Cinecolor, named ComiColor Cartoons. The ComiColor series mostly focused on fairy tales with no continuing character or star. Later in the 1940s, this series received home-movie distribution by Castle Films. Cinecolor produced the 16 mm prints for Castle Films with red emulsion on one side and blue emulsion on the other. Later in the 1970s Blackhawk Films released these for home use, but this time using conventional Eastmancolor film stock. They are now in the public domain and are available on VHS and DVD. He also experimented with stop-motion animation in combination with the multiplane camera, and made a short called The Toy Parade, which was never released in public. In 1936, backers withdrew financial support from the Iwerks Studio, and it folded soon after.

In 1937, Leon Schlesinger Productions contracted Iwerks to produce four Looney Tunes shorts starring Porky Pig and Gabby Goat. Iwerks directed the first two shorts, while former Schlesinger animator Robert Clampett was promoted to director and helmed the other two shorts before he and his unit returned to the main Schlesinger lot. Iwerks then did contract work for Screen Gems (then Columbia Pictures' cartoon division)  where he was the director of several of the Color Rhapsody shorts before returning to work for Disney in 1940.

 Return to Disney (1940–1964) 
After his return to the Disney studio, Iwerks mainly worked on developing special visual effects. He is credited as developing the processes for combining live-action and animation used in Song of the South (1946), as well as the xerographic process adapted for cel animation, which was used in 101 Dalmatians (1961). He also worked at WED Enterprises, now Walt Disney Imagineering, helping to develop many Disney theme park attractions during the 1960s. Iwerks did special effects work outside the studio as well, including the birds for his Academy Award nominated achievement for Alfred Hitchcock's The Birds (1963). Iwerks' last credit for Disney was for perfecting the travel matte system for the Mary Poppins sequence "Feed the Birds"

Iwerks' most famous work outside creating and animating Mickey Mouse was Flip the Frog from his own studio. According to Chuck Jones, who worked for him, "He was the first, if not the first, to give his characters depth and roundness. But he had no concept of humor; he simply wasn't a funny guy." While he was at Disney, he developed a variety of patents in Xerographic applications to animation.

 Personal life 
On 24 July 1929, Donald Warren Iwerks was born to Mildred Sarah Henderson and Ubbe Ert Iwerks.

On 14 January 1933, David Lee Iwerks was born to Mildred Sarah Henderson and Ubbe Ert Iwerks, he became a portrait photographer.

Ub Iwerks had a garage gun shop.

Iwerks died in 1971 of a heart attack in Burbank, California, aged 70, and his ashes are interred in a niche in the Columbarium of Remembrance at Forest Lawn Memorial Park, Hollywood Hills Cemetery. The last project he worked on was the Hall of Presidents.

He is the grandfather of documentary film producer Leslie Iwerks.

 Influence and tributes 
The Ub Iwerks Award for Technical Achievement, as part of the Annie Awards, is named in his honour.

A rare self-portrait of Iwerks was found in the garbage bin at an animation studio in Burbank. The portrait was saved and is now part of the Animation Archives in Burbank, California.

After World War II, much of Iwerks' early animation style was imitated by legendary manga artists Osamu Tezuka and Shotaro Ishinomori.

In 1989, Iwerks was named a Disney Legend.

In the 1996 The Simpsons episode "The Day the Violence Died", a relationship similar to Iwerks' early relationship with Walt Disney is used as the main plot.

A documentary film, The Hand Behind the Mouse: The Ub Iwerks Story, was released in 1999, followed by a book written by Iwerks' granddaughter Leslie Iwerks and John Kenworthy in 2001. The documentary, created by Leslie Iwerks, was released as part of The Walt Disney Treasures, Wave VII series (disc two of The Adventures of Oswald the Lucky Rabbit collection).

A feature film released in 2014 Walt Before Mickey, showed how Ub Iwerks, portrayed by Armando Gutierrez, and Walt Disney, portrayed by Thomas Ian Nicholas, co-created Mickey Mouse.

The sixth episode from the second season of Drunk History ("Hollywood"), tells about Ub's work relationship with Disney, with stress on the creation of Mickey Mouse. Iwerks was portrayed in the episode by Tony Hale.

 Filmography 

 1930 

 1931 

 1932 

 1933 

 1934 

 1935 
All Comicolor shorts

 1936 
All Comicolor shorts

 1937–1940 
Contract work to  Leon Schlesinger Productions – two cartoons
Contract work to Screen Gems/Columbia Pictures – 17 cartoons (Iwerks was only personally involved with 16 of the Color Rhapsody series, the last cartoon in the deal was completed by Paul Fennell after Iwerks had left his own studio)
 In 1940, Iwerks produced his last series, Gran'pop Monkey, featuring the art of British illustrator Lawson Wood. Three cartoons were made: "A Busy Day", "Beauty Shoppe" and "Baby Checkers".

 Accolades 

 See also 

 Walt Disney (2015 PBS film)

 Further reading 
 Don Iwerks, Walt Disney's Ultimate Inventor (Disney Editions, 2019)
 
 
 
 
 Jeff Lenburg, The Great Cartoon Directors (Da Capo Press, 1993)
 Leonard Maltin, Of Mice and Magic: A History of American Animated Cartoons'' (Penguin Books, 1987)

References

External links 
 
 
 

1901 births
1971 deaths
Recipients of the Scientific and Technical Academy Award of Merit
American cartoonists
American people of Frisian descent
American animated film directors
American animated film producers
Animators from Missouri
Burials at Forest Lawn Memorial Park (Hollywood Hills)
Disney imagineers
Film directors from Missouri
Walt Disney Animation Studios people
Artists from Kansas City, Missouri
Special effects people
Disney comics artists
Warner Bros. Cartoons directors
Academy Award for Technical Achievement winners
Laugh-O-Gram Studio people
Disney Legends